Satan s'amuse (Satán se divierte in Spanish, Satan at Play in English) is a 1907 French silent film directed by pioneer Segundo de Chomón. It is often confused with Le spectre rouge, in the IMDb database and on YouTube attributions.

Plot
The Devil is bored. He goes back to Earth with a magic elevator. He surprises two sewer workers, disguises himself as a city man, and spreads improbable events: quarrel with a coachman, altercation with a city sergeant, the mystification of a barman, and quid pro quo with couples. He gets trapped in a cage with a young woman and goes down to Hell. It is revealed that the young woman is in fact Madame Devil, disguised by jealousy.

External links

References

1907 films
1907 horror films
French silent films
French black-and-white films
1900s fantasy films
Films directed by Segundo de Chomón
The Devil in film
French fantasy films
Silent horror films